"Disturbia" is a song recorded by Barbadian singer Rihanna for Good Girl Gone Bad: Reloaded (2008), a re-release of her third studio album Good Girl Gone Bad (2007). It was written by Andre Merritt, Chris Brown, Brian Kennedy and Rob. A!, with the production of the song helmed by Kennedy. The song was released as the third single from the reloaded edition of the album, and seventh overall. "Disturbia" was sent to US contemporary hit radio on June 17, 2008, and was released as a CD single in the United Kingdom on July 22, 2008.

"Disturbia" is an uptempo dance-pop and electropop song with a "sizzling" beat. Lyrically, the song is about the experiences of anguish, anxiety, and confusion. The song received positive reviews from music critics, who generally praised its dark musical tone, lyrics and beat, and noted that it is reminiscent of Rihanna's previous single, "Don't Stop the Music" (2007). "Disturbia" earned Rihanna an award for Best International Song at the 2009 NRJ Music Awards and a nomination for Best Dance Recording at the 2009 Grammy Awards.

"Disturbia" was a commercial success, and peaked at number one in Belgium (Flanders) and New Zealand and became a top-ten hit in more than twenty countries including Australia, Canada, and the United Kingdom. The song topped the US Billboard Hot 100 chart for two consecutive weeks, and became Rihanna's third number-one single from Good Girl Gone Bad and fourth overall on the Hot 100. The accompanying music video for "Disturbia" was directed by Anthony Mandler, which portrays Rihanna in various locations such as in a prison cell and gas chamber. "Disturbia" has regularly featured on the set lists of Rihanna's tours and live performances since its release.

Background

"Disturbia" was written by American recording artist Chris Brown and his team which included Brian Kennedy, Rob. A, and Andre Merritt, better known as the Graffiti Artizts. The track was originally considered to be part of the re-release edition of Brown's second studio album, Exclusive (2007). However, after finishing the song, he took preference to another song, "Forever", which later became the lead single from his re-released album, titled Exclusive: The Forever Edition (2008). He felt that "Disturbia" would be better suited for a female singer and instead forwarded the song to Rihanna. When writing the song, he was inspired "to go totally left and kind of weird". Speaking to USA Today, Brown described his feelings with regard to him giving the song to Rihanna: "It's fun being creative and even if you have a concept in your head to write about, you can write it and give it and give it to someone else because it might not personally fit you, but it might be an idea you have."

"Disturbia" was recorded in April 2008 at Rocky Mountain Recorders in Denver, Colorado. Speaking to Nick Levine of Digital Spy, Rihanna explained: "I went into the studio making music my way. I found myself all at once." In an interview on This Morning, Rihanna said that the song is not necessarily about a specific personal experience, but rather the general feelings of mental anguish, anxiety and confusion. Rihanna further explained that she wanted to record the song because she felt that listeners would be able to relate to the subject matter. When Good Girl Gone Bad was repackaged, Rihanna approached L.A. Reid, boss of Def Jam, suggesting to release "Disturbia" as a single and follow-up to "Take a Bow". Speaking to MTV News, Reid said, "It was the first time Rihanna actually came to me and said, 'Here's the song I want to put out.' She played me the song. That was her taking control [...] She understands what hits are, and she knows what she wants to say. She's at that place where she can do that."

Composition

Musically, "Disturbia" is an uptempo dance-pop and electropop song with a "sizzling" beat. The song is reminiscent of Rihanna's previous single "Don't Stop the Music" (2007). The rock-tinged song opens with a horror movie-like scream, followed by the hook "Bum-bum-be-dum-bum-bum-be-dum-bum" which has been likened to the "Ella-ella-ella-ey-ey" hook from "Umbrella" (2007). BBC News interpreted it as Rihanna singing about being frightened but felt that its lyrics made no sense.

Fraser McAlpine from BBC Music has claimed that the song's chorus can be likened to Eiffel 65's "Blue (Da Ba Dee)" (1999). According to digital music sheet published at Musicnotes.com by Sony/ATV Music Publishing, "Disturbia" is composed in a key of B minor and is set in common time with a moderate techno-pop groove. Rihanna's vocal range spans from the lower note of D3 to the high note of E5 and the track follows a chord progression of Bm-D-A-G in the verses and chorus. The song features various vocal effects, namely the use of Auto-Tune and a vocoder in contrast with the detached electronic bounce of the song and its weaving, winding melody.

Reception and accolades
"Disturbia" received positive reviews from contemporary music critics. Josh Tyrangiel of Time complimented the song's "rubber-ball melodies that bounce around your head". Alex Fletcher of Digital Spy said that unlike the usual seventh single release by an artist, "Disturbia" is one Rihanna's stronger releases and that it proves that she is ruling '08 much like she did '07. He went on to describe it as a "fun-packed electro treat filled with sizzling beats and crazy vocal effects." Fletcher further highlighted the song's strong intro hook and said that the chorus is her catchiest since "Umbrella". Spence D of IGN felt that the track has an infectious "Bum-bum-be-dum-bum-bum" hook that sucks you into the detached electronic bounce of the track. Jaime Gill from Yahoo! Music highlighted the song's "insistent hook, sturdy beat and weaving, winding melody." Fraser McAlpine from the BBC Music deemed the song's plus points to be Rihanna's icy whine, the frosty-rave chorus and the Eiffel 65-like refrain.

Billboard ranked the song at number nine on its list of "Songs of the Summer of 2008". Time magazine has named the song on number two on its list of '10 Best Songs of the Summer', only behind Kid Rock's "All Summer Long". According to Caryn Ganz of Rolling Stone, "Disturbia" was the second best song of 2008, only behind MGMT's "Kids". The song won the award for Best International Song at the 2009 NRJ Music Awards, however, after a miscommunication, Katy Perry accepted the award for her single "I Kissed a Girl". Later, it was revealed that originally Rihanna won the award. The song also earned Rihanna a nomination for Best Dance Recording at the 51st Annual Grammy Awards, but lost to Daft Punk's "Harder, Better, Faster, Stronger".

Chart performance

"Disturbia" debuted on the US Billboard Hot 100 at number eighteen on June 26, 2008, becoming Rihanna's sixth top 20 from Good Girl Gone Bad. In the issue dated August 14, 2008 the song topped the chart, selling 148,000 downloads according to Nielsen SoundScan and replaced Katy Perry's "I Kissed a Girl" after seven weeks at the top. "Disturbia" became Rihanna's fourth number-one song on the chart only after "SOS", "Umbrella" and "Take a Bow", and tied her with Beyoncé and Mariah Carey for most number-one singles of the decade. The single topped the chart for two consecutive weeks. For the Billboard issue dated September 13, 2008, "Disturbia" also topped both the Hot Dance Club Play and Hot Dance Airplay charts. The song also peaked at number one on the US Billboard Pop Songs, becoming her third number one on the chart, after "Unfaithful" and "Take a Bow". "Disturbia" has been certified six-times platinum by the RIAA, having sold 4.8 million digital copies as of June 2015, marking Rihanna's third best-selling single in the country. The song was also successful in Canada, where it peaked at number two on the Canadian Hot 100, remaining at the position for five weeks.

In the United Kingdom, following the release of Good Girl Gone Bad: Reloaded, "Disturbia" debuted on the UK Singles Chart at number forty-seven due to strong digital sales. After the release of the music video, the song re-entered the chart at number forty-seven, ultimately peaking at number three from digital sales. The song remained within the top ten for eleven weeks, marking Rihanna's eighth top ten single in the country. "Disturbia" also became Rihanna's third longest charting single in the UK, having spent 36 weeks in the top 100, being passed only by "Don't Stop the Music" and the worldwide hit single "Umbrella". "Disturbia" has sold over 430,000 copies in the country as of 2010.

Elsewhere in Europe, "Disturbia" managed to reach the top ten in fifteen other countries. The song debuted on number three in France and stayed there for one week. Disturbia stayed on the French Singles Chart for 36 weeks, becoming Rihanna's second longest charting single on it, only after "Only Girl (In the World). The single was more successful in Belgium (Flanders) where it peaked at number one and managed to peak at number four in Belgium (Wallonia). It was later certified Gold by the Belgian Entertainment Association for selling over 10,000 copies. In Spain, "Disturbia" reached a peak of ten and was also certified Gold by the Productores de Música de España. The song managed to reach number two in Finland, number three in Norway, number four in Austria, Denmark, Hungary, the Republic of Ireland, Sweden and Switzerland, number five in Germany, number seven in Slovakia, and number ten in Czech Republic and Netherlands. It also reached number one in New Zealand, becoming Rihanna's third number one single, and her first since "Umbrella". On August 23, 2009 "Disturbia" was certified Platinum, for selling over 15,000 copies. In Australia, it managed to reach number six. It was certified Gold on the downloads alone, before the physical release several weeks later, when it was subsequently certified Platinum.

Music video

Background
The music video for "Disturbia" was filmed in Los Angeles, California. Originally, it was reported that the video was directed by American photographer and director, David LaChapelle, who previously directed Christina Aguilera's "Dirrty" (2002) and Gwen Stefani's "Rich Girl" (2004). However, later sources surfaced stating that the video was directed by Rihanna's long collaborator Anthony Mandler, who previously directed her music videos for "Shut Up and Drive" (2007), "Hate That I Love You" (2007) and "Take a Bow" (2008). Rihanna also co-directed the video, becoming her second work after the co-direction for the 2007 single "Don't Stop the Music". The "Disturbia" music video, was released exclusively on iTunes on July 22, 2008.

Synopsis and reception

The music video for "Disturbia" begins in a surrealistic, circus-like torture chamber where Rihanna is seen dressed in black, wearing dark make-up and long black nails while she presses the keys of a big dark piano and looks into the camera. As the song starts different images of Rihanna are shown. In one of the scenes, she is seen imprisoned wearing lenses that make it look as if her eyes have rolled into the back of her head. Rihanna stays in the prison with two men watching on her from both sides. Other scenes include Rihanna sitting on a throne chair and singing the song, while two strange women (one is played by American drag queen Detox Icunt) surround her. Then, multiple people around her are holding her in front of a gas chamber. As the chorus starts, Rihanna is seen tied up in a bed from which she can't escape. During the song's bridge, Rihanna and her dancers perform a Thriller-esque dance routine. As the second verse starts, Rihanna is seen holding a column and fire is around her. As the song continues, Rihanna drags a man doll around a metal web. In the second chorus, she wears metal spines while tarantulas are all over her body. Also her hands are being stuck in the wall and her legs in the floor creating a disturbing and shocking image for the viewers. In the later scene, Rihanna is in a very tiny room, with her hands and legs being tied up. The video ends with Rihanna turning around in her chair.

According to Tamar Anitai from MTV Buzzworthy, "Disturbia" is "yin to the yang of Chris Brown's 'Wall to Wall' which features creepy-crawly chicks climbing the walls in latex." He later, listed the video at number five on the "Buzzworthy's Top 5 Most Paranoid Music Videos" stating: "In Rihanna's 'Disturbia' video, obsession manifests itself in freaky-deaky tarantulas, wigs, wolves, and a creepy dude in an eye patch. And S&M-y corsets. Paranoia never looked so supernaturally sexy!". Simon Vozick-Levinson from Entertainment Weekly also reviewed the video commenting: "It looks like she accidentally wandered into Nine Inch Nails 'Closer' video, or else some sort of freaky Victorian mental hospital". He later continued saying that the video is not what he expected from a dance-pop song, but that "it's also cool that Rihanna is trying something new." Jillian Mapes of Billboard wrote that in the video, Rihanna created "a memorable and edgy image akin more to Marilyn Manson than her Top 40 colleagues." The video was voted the sixth-best music video of the 2000s in a Billboard poll.

Live performances

Rihanna performed "Disturbia" for first time at the 2008 MTV Video Music Awards. The song opened the show, and was performed after Britney Spears' opening speech. Rihanna performed it while revealing a leather "goth inspired" outfit. Together with the dancer troops, she performed a Thriller inspired dance, with glow sticks and leather props being used through the performance. About the performance, Brian Orloff from People commented that "after Britney left, the stage was ceded to a futuristic-looking Rihanna, who launched into her hit 'Disturbia' with a goth-theme." In 2011, according to poll made by Billboard, the performance was the tenth best ever on the MTV Video Music Awards. On September 19, 2008, Rihanna went to France, to perform "Disturbia" at Star Academy France. Following the performance of the song, Good Girl Gone Bad: Reloaded soared from number forty-three to number eleven and peaked at number eight the following week, becoming Rihanna's first album to reach the top ten in France. Rihanna also performed "Disturbia" at the NFL Pepsi Smash Super Bowl Bash in Tampa, Florida held the Thursday and Friday prior to the 2009 Super Bowl. It was the first song on the set-list that also featured other songs from her latest release Good Girl Gone Bad. The performance of the song featured a sample from White Stripes song "Seven Nation Army" and flames that shot up across the front of the stage.

Following the release of her fourth studio album Rated R (2009), Rihanna held a Nokia promotional concert at Brixton Academy in London. Rihanna performed the song as part of a set list, which included some songs from the new release: "Russian Roulette", "Wait Your Turn" and "Hard", the latter of which Rihanna was joined on stage by Young Jeezy, to perform the song together. However, during the set, Rihanna also performed other songs from Good Girl Gone Bad, including "Don't Stop the Music" and "Take a Bow". On February 5, 2010, Rihanna performed at the Pepsi Super Bowl in Miami, Florida, performing "Disturbia" in a medley with other songs including "Russian Roulette" and "Wait Your Turn". In February 2010 she also recorded an AOL Sessions, where she performed the song together with other tracks including "Hard", "Rude Boy" and "Take a Bow".

Rihanna performed "Disturbia" on her three major tours: Good Girl Gone Bad (2007—09), Last Girl on Earth (2010—11) and the Loud Tour (2011). The song was added on the Good Girl Gone Bad Tour set list during the Australasian leg of the tour. It was the opening song, performed only after the intro on the tour. Rihanna also performed "Disturbia" on her second major concert tour, Last Girl on Earth Tour. Rihanna performed a slower ballad remix tempo of the song, surrounded by three big four-legged insect monsters as she crawled on the floor to escape while singing it. About the performance Lisa Wilton from Calgary Sun commented that: "Rihanna's goth side came out – and by 'goth side' I mean she sang alongside dancers dressed as freaky, giant spiders – during the darker dancefloor anthem, 'Disturbia'." On her Loud Tour, Rihanna performed "Disturbia" as second track, only after the opening song "Only Girl (In the World)". Rihanna performed the song in a brightly colored sequined bikini, while partially been dragging on a moveable floor. Rob Williams from Winnipeg Free Press stated: "Rihanna dropped her blue coat to reveal a jewel-encrusted bikini for 'Disturbia'. It was the first of numerous costume changes that showed off her fashion sense and plenty of skin." Rihanna performed "Disturbia" at Radio 1's Hackney Weekend on May 24, 2012, as the second song on the setlist.

Formats and track listing

 Digital download
 "Disturbia" (Album Version) – 4:00
 "Disturbia" (Instrumental) – 3:58

 Digital Remixes
 "Disturbia" (Jody Den Broeder Remix) – 7:45
 "Disturbia" (Craig C's Master Vocal Mix) – 9:17
 "Disturbia" (Craig C's and Nique's Tribal Mayhem Mix) – 8:21
 "Disturbia" (Jody Den Broeder Bum Bum Dub) – 8:15
 "Disturbia" (Craig C's Disturbstramental Mix) – 9:17

 FR Extended Play
 "Disturbia" (Album Version) – 4:00
 "Disturbia" (Jody den Broeder Radio Edit) – 3:52
 "Disturbia" (Instrumental) – 3:58

 UK and German CD single
 "Disturbia" – 3:58
 "Disturbia" (Jody den Broeder Radio Edit) – 3:52
 "Disturbia" (Instrumental) – 3:58
 "Disturbia" (Music video) – 4:20

Credits and personnel 

Credits are taken from Good Girl Gone Bad: Reloaded liner notes.

Lead Vocals by Rihanna
Backing vocals by Andre Meritt and Chris Brown
Written and composed by Andre Meritt, Chris Brown, Brian Kennedy and Robert Allen
Produced by Brian Kennedy
Recorded at the Rocky Mountain Recorders in Denver, Colorado
Recorded by Andrew Vastola
Vocal Production by Makeba Ridick
Mixed by Phil Tan
Assistant (s): Carlos Oyanedel

Charts

Weekly charts

Year-end charts

Decade-end charts

Certifications and sales

Release history

See also
 List of Ultratop 50 number-one singles of 2008
 New Zealand top 50 singles of 2008
 List of Billboard Hot 100 number ones of 2008
 List of Billboard Hot Dance Club Play number ones of 2008
 List of best-selling singles in the United States

References

External links
 

Rihanna songs
2008 singles
Billboard Hot 100 number-one singles
Number-one singles in Belgium
Number-one singles in New Zealand
Music videos directed by Anthony Mandler
Songs written by Andre Merritt
Songs written by Chris Brown
Songs written by Brian Kennedy (record producer)
Electropop songs
2007 songs
2008 songs
Songs about diseases and disorders